Association Sportive et Culturelle de Boeny, better known as ASCB Boeny, is a Malagasy basketball club based in the Boeny district. The team plays in the Malagasy N1A, the national highest level league. The club joined the N1A in 2017, and won the national championship the same year.

Honours
Malagasy N1A
Champions (1): 2017
Malagasy President Cup
Champions (1): 2017

Notable players
Elly Randriamampionona (2014–2018)

References

Basketball teams in Madagascar